Majid KhosraviNik is a Senior Lecturer in Digital Media and Discourse Studies at Newcastle University, UK.

He works on digital media studies, discourse studies and politics. 
He has published on critical discourse studies including immigration discourses, Self and Other representations, national identity, right-wing populism and identity conflicts in the Middle East.

His latest book was Social Media, Discourse and Politics: contemporary spaces of power and critique.

He has carried out major research on identity constructions within discourses around Iran's nuclear programme which was published in 2015. He has been working on developing a CDS approach to digital spaces of communication on participatory web.

KhosraviNik has developed his theorisation of the field around a digital critical discourse studies model under the title of Social Media Critical Discourse Studies (SM-CDS). This involves interdisciplinary examination of theoretical and methodological issues in the field including major studies on discourses of national identity in the Middle East e.g. Arabism.

Most recently KhosraviNik has elaborated the concept of Techno-Discursive Design in social media whereby algorithmic regimentation of content and practices are theorised as a fundamental context of a new dynamic of discursive practice and politics. Together with the integration of research in Affects, Big Data, politics of democratisation and populism, the approach explores the critical implications of shifts in discourse formation and consumption in new media and wider consequences for a fundamental understanding of politics and democracy in both late capitalist context of the West as well as the context of developing world. Dr. KhosraviNik's Social Media-CDS approach has been taken up in a range of emerging interdisciplinary studies for example in discourses of cyber terrorism, digital misogyny and digital populism/nationalism. 
  
KhosraviNik is a co-founder of Newcastle Critical Discourse Group. He sits on the editorial board of Critical Discourse Studies and Journal of Language and Politics while acting as expert assessor and referee for a range of international publishers and research grant organisations including the EU Commission.

KhosraviNik received his PhD from Lancaster University, Lancaster, under the supervision of Ruth Wodak. He was part of RASIM, an ESRC funded research project, which explored the representation of migrants in the British press.

External links 

 immigration discourses, 
 Self and Other representations, 
 right wing populism 
 Social Media, Discourse and Politics: contemporary spaces of power and critique
 theoretical and methodological issues
 national identity in the Middle East
 Arabism
 Techno-Discursive Design
 politics of democratisation and populism
 new media

Bibliography
 Social Media, Discourse and Politics: contemporary spaces of power and critique (forthcoming) 
 Right-wing Populism in Europe: politics and discourse (2013)
 Discourse, Identity and Legitimacy: Self and Other in representations of Iran's nuclear program (2015)
 The Discourse of Financial Crisis and Austerity (2017)

References

Academics of Newcastle University
Living people
Year of birth missing (living people)